Ryan's Creek Aerodrome  is a small airstrip on Stewart Island in southern New Zealand.

History
The aerodrome was built in the late 1970s to accommodate operations by Stewart Island Air Services. In the mid-1980s the runway and taxiways were asphalted. In 1990 a hill at one end of the strip was leveled; this left more room for aircraft to land and allowed easier access to the airstrip.

The aerodrome is currently used by Stewart Island Flights for scheduled services to Invercargill Airport.

Facilities
It has one runway, designated "04/22", which measures .

Airlines and destinations

See also

 List of airports in New Zealand
 List of airlines of New Zealand
 Transport in New Zealand

References

Airports in New Zealand
Stewart Island
Transport in Southland, New Zealand
Transport buildings and structures in Southland, New Zealand